The 1941 Tour of Flanders was held in 1941.

General classification

Final general classification

References
Résultats sur siteducyclisme.net
Résultats sur cyclebase.nl
Résultats sur les-sports.info

External links
 

Tour of Flanders
1941 in road cycling
1941 in Belgian sport